Malaunay is a commune of the Rouen Metropolis in the Seine-Maritime department in Normandy, Northwestern France.

Geography
Agriculture, farming and light industry are the mainstay of the local economy.

Population

Places of interest
 The church of St.Nicolas, dating from the nineteenth century.
 An old manorhouse.

Twin towns
 Sandy, United Kingdom
 Amer, Spain

See also
Communes of the Seine-Maritime department

References

External links

Official website of Malaunay 

Communes of Seine-Maritime